Sundarakanda is 1991 Indian Kannada-language action thriller film written and directed by K. V. Raju and produced by Sridevi under Sri Vijayalakshmi Cine Arts. The film stars Shankar Nag and Shivaranjini, with Devaraj, Jaggesh and Avinash playing supporting roles.
This film was the last movie of Shankar Nag as an actor and it was released posthumously.

Cast
Shankar Nag
Devaraj
Shivaranjini
Jayanti
Mysore Lokesh
Avinash
Doddanna
Jaggesh

References

External links
 

1991 films
1990s Kannada-language films
Indian action films
Films scored by S. P. Venkatesh
1991 action films